Sir Roper Lethbridge  (23 December 1840 – 15 February 1919) was a British academic and civil servant in India and a Conservative Party politician who sat in the House of Commons from 1885 to 1892.

Early life and education
Lethbridge was the son of E. Lethbridge of Ste. Addresse, France. He was educated at Exeter College, Oxford and entered Inner Temple in 1864.

Career
He was appointed a Professor in the Bengal Educational Department in 1868, and became a Fellow of University of Calcutta and Secretary of Simla Educational Commission. He was Editor of the Calcutta Quarterly Review from 1871 to 1878. In 1877, he moved to the Indian Political Department as Political Agent, 1st class, and was appointed Press Commissioner in 1878 when he was awarded Companion of the Indian Empire. He was knighted in 1885. Lethbridge was Hon. Member of the Anjuman-i-Punjab, a Member of the Asiatic Society and the Asiatic Society of Bengal and a Member of Council of East Indian Association and of the National Indian Association.

At the 1885 general election Lethbridge was elected as the Member of Parliament (MP) for Kensington North. He was re-elected in 1886 held the seat until he stood down at the 1892 election.  He was awarded a KCIE in the 1890 Birthday Honours.

Lethbridge wrote several works about India.

He died at the age of 78.

Personal life
Lethbridge married Eliza Finlay in 1865. Their daughter Caroline married Frederick Gorell Barnes. He married his second wife Emma Neave in 1897. They lived at Cornwall Terrace, Regent's Park, London.

Publications
A Short Manual of the History of India (1881)

{{cite book|title=The Indian Offer of Imperial Preference PS King 1913 and Read Books, 2006 |isbn=1-4067-2001-1|url=https://books.google.com/books?id=s0L_YJhwgf4C&q=%22Roper+Lethbridge%22|last1=Lethbridge|first1=Roper|date=November 2006}}Swadeshi and British Fiscal PolicyDevon and Cornwall Notes and Queries'' 1919

References

External links
 
 
 
 

1840 births
1919 deaths
Conservative Party (UK) MPs for English constituencies
UK MPs 1885–1886
UK MPs 1886–1892
English Indologists
Indian Civil Service (British India) officers
Alumni of Exeter College, Oxford
Members of the Inner Temple
Knights Commander of the Order of the Indian Empire
Roper